Constitution of 1978 may refer to:

1978 Constitution of the People's Republic of China
Russian Constitution of 1978
Spanish Constitution of 1978
Constitution of the Moldavian SSR (1978)